Pool B of the 2015 Fed Cup Asia/Oceania Group I was one of two pools in the Asia/Oceania Group I of the 2015 Fed Cup. Three teams competed in a round robin competition, with the top team and the bottom two teams proceeding to their respective sections of the play-offs: the top team played for advancement to the World Group II Play-offs, while the bottom team faced potential relegation to Group II.

Standings

Round-robin

Thailand vs. Chinese Taipei

Kazakhstan vs. China

Thailand vs. China

Kazakhstan vs. Chinese Taipei

Thailand vs. Kazakhstan

China vs. Chinese Taipei

References

External links 
 Fed Cup website

B1